Yennier Canó (born March 9, 1994) is a Cuban professional baseball pitcher for the Baltimore Orioles of Major League Baseball (MLB). He made his MLB debut in 2022 with the Minnesota Twins.

Career

Minnesota Twins
Canó played in the Cuban National Series for the Tigres de Ciego de Ávila from 2013 to 2016. He signed with the Minnesota Twins as an international free agent in June 2019. 

Canó was called up to the majors for the first time on May 11, 2022.

Baltimore Orioles
The Twins traded Canó, Cade Povich, Juan Rojas, and Juan Nunez to the Baltimore Orioles for Jorge López on August 2, 2022.

References

External links

1994 births
Living people
Major League Baseball players from Cuba
Cuban expatriate baseball players in the United States
People from Ciego de Ávila
Major League Baseball pitchers
Minnesota Twins players
Baltimore Orioles players
Tigres de Ciego de Avila players
Gulf Coast Twins players
Fort Myers Miracle players
Atenienses de Manatí (baseball) players
Wichita Wind Surge players
St. Paul Saints players
Pan American Games bronze medalists for Cuba
Baseball players at the 2015 Pan American Games
Pan American Games medalists in baseball
Medalists at the 2015 Pan American Games